Hayden Gavine is an Australian rules football umpire currently officiating in the Australian Football League.

He umpired in the Victorian Football League before joining the AFL list. He has officiated in over 60 VFL matches, including the 2015 and '16 Grand Finals. He was appointed to the senior AFL umpiring list for the 2017 season, and officiated in 10 matches in his debut season.

References

Living people
Australian Football League umpires
Year of birth missing (living people)